The 1960 Volta a Catalunya was the 40th edition of the Volta a Catalunya cycle race and was held from 4 September to 11 September 1960. The race started in Montjuïc and finished in Barcelona. The race was won by Miguel Poblet.

General classification

References

1960
Volta
1960 in Spanish road cycling
September 1960 sports events in Europe